Judith Lapierre is a professor in Nursing at the Université Laval. She studied at the International Space University in France.

In 1999, Lapierre accused two Russian cosmonauts of sexual harassment after a 110-day simulation of space station living.  Among the claims were an unwarranted kiss during a New Year's Celebration; project coordinator Valery Gushin later claimed that her "refusing to be kissed" had been a leading cause for the experiment's failure.

References

Year of birth missing (living people)
Living people
Academic staff of Université Laval